Five Compositions (Quartet) 1986 is an album by American saxophonist and composer Anthony Braxton recorded in 1986 for the Italian Black Saint label.

Reception
The Allmusic review by Stephen Cook awarded the album 4½ stars stating "By the time of this mid-'80s quartet date, Braxton was just starting to get better compensated for his music and was also formalizing his heady compositional formula; this advance was helped along considerably by his stellar quartet... Knotty music to be sure, but some of Braxton's most rewarding".

Track listing
All compositions by Anthony Braxton.

 "Composition No. 131" - 6:45 
 "Composition No. 99" - 5:50 
 "Composition No. 124" - 9:05 
 "Composition No. 122" - 9:20 
 "Composition No. 101" - 11:25

Personnel
Anthony Braxton - flute, clarinet, alto saxophone, tenor saxophone, C melody saxophone, sopranino saxophone
David Rosenboom - piano
Mark Dresser - bass
Gerry Hemingway - percussion

References

Black Saint/Soul Note albums
Anthony Braxton albums
1986 albums